Saint Germana may refer to

 Saint Germaine Cousin (1579–1601), French saint.
 Saint Grimonia, 4th-century Irish martyr